Sugar Loaf Cay is an island in the Bahamas, located in the district of Central Abaco. At the 2010 census, the island was depopulated.

The island provides habitat for the Bahama Nighthawk (Chordeiles virginianus vicinus).

References

Islands of the Bahamas